János Scholz (December 20, 1903 – June 3, 1993) was a Hungarian-born American cellist and art collector.

Early life
Scholz was born in 1903 in Sopron, Hungary. He graduated from the Franz Liszt Academy of Music in Budapest.

Career
Scholz began playing the cello with the Budapest Symphony Orchestra. He joined the Roth Quartet in 1932. By 1933, he was a cellist in New York City. He became "one of the great cellists of the twentieth century." He also taught at Columbia University and New York University.

Scholz began his Italian Art collection in 1935 which grew to 1500 drawings. Representing drawings of both major and minor artists of Italy they are noted for the quality of individual works and the comprehensive nature. In 1973, he donated the works, including "drawings by Pisanello, Veronese, Titian, Guercino, and Piranesi", to Morgan Library & Museum.

Scholz conducted seminars for New York University Institute of Fine Arts, Columbia University and the New School for Social Research providing rare first hand contact with works through his collection. Many exhibitions were organized in the U.S., Canada and Italy.

Personal life and death
Scholz was married twice. His first wife was Anne Bigelow Rosen. His second wife, Helen Marshall Schelling, was the widow of conductor Ernest Schelling. They resided on the Upper East Side in Manhattan, New York City. Scholz had two sons with Anne Bigelow Rosen and one with Helen Marshall Schelling.

Scholz died on June 3, 1993 in New York City, at age 89.

Art collecting and Philanthropy 
Scholz assembled a large collection of Italian drawings, acquiring, in 1939, theatre-related drawings from Michael Mayr, and, in 1944,  1000 Italian drawings, including 49 Bibienas. In 1973 Scholz offered to bequeath his collection to the Pierpont Morgan Library in New York.

Scholz also donated more than 5,000 photographs to the Snite Museum of Art at the University of Notre Dame as well as works to the Metropolitan Museum of Art.

In 2016 the Metropolitan Museum of Art reached a settlement with the family of Michael Berolzheimer, a Jewish art collector who had been persecuted by the Nazis, for a drawing of a stag that Scholz had gifted to the museum.

Selected works

Italian Master Drawings, 1350-1800, From The Janos Scholz Collection, Selected And Described by Janos Scholz

References

External links

1903 births
1993 deaths
People from Sopron
People from the Upper East Side
Hungarian emigrants to the United States
Franz Liszt Academy of Music alumni
American cellists
American art collectors
20th-century cellists